Björn Borg was the defending champion but did not compete that year.

Jimmy Connors won in the final 6–7, 6–1, 6–4, 6–3 against Dick Stockton.

Seeds
A champion seed is indicated in bold text while text in italics indicates the round in which that seed was eliminated.

  Jimmy Connors (champion)
  Dick Stockton (final)
  Ilie Năstase (quarterfinals)
  Wojciech Fibak (quarterfinals)
  Vitas Gerulaitis (semifinals)
  Eddie Dibbs (semifinals)
  Adriano Panatta (quarterfinals)
  Cliff Drysdale (quarterfinals)

Draw

References
1977 World Championship Tennis Finals Draw (Archived 2009-05-06)

Singles